Fantôme (French "phantom") may refer to:

Places
 Fantome Island, an island off the east coast of Australia
 Fantome Rock, a dangerous rock in the South Atlantic

Ships and planes
 HMS Fantome, several ships of the Royal Navy
 Fantome (schooner), a 1927 sail cruise ship lost in Hurricane Mitch in 1998
 Fantome-class sloop, used by the Royal Navy
 Fantome-class survey motor boat, used in Australia
 Fairey Fantôme, a British fighter aircraft of the 1930s

Literature and entertainment
 Fantôme (album), a 2016 Japanese album by Utada Hikaru
 , a volume in the French comic books series La Patrouille des Castors
 Fantôme (studio), a French animation studio
 "Le Fantôme", a chanson by Georges Brassens 
 "Fantômes", a poem by Victor Hugo from the collection Les Orientales en 1829
 , a French film by Jean-Paul Civeyrac
 Les Fantômes (band), French rock group of the 1960s

Other
 Fantôme Brewery, a brewery in Wallonia, Belgium

See also
 
 Phantom (disambiguation)
 Fantom (disambiguation)